(), meaning Middle Europe, is one of the German terms for Central Europe. The term has acquired diverse cultural, political and historical connotations. 

Basis 
The German term "Mitteleuropa" is not used or understood in the same way in all areas of Europe. The term has also been used differently over time. In Austria, Hungary, Slovenia, Croatia and northern Italy, especially in Friuli and Trieste, the common definition is somewhat different from that in Germany: Mitteleuropa is equated with the successor states of the former Austro-Hungarian monarchy. Regions such as the Baltic States and the North German-Polish plains are perceived as "Northern European", other parts of Germany as "Western European". For example, the today Central European (Mitteleuropean) Order of St. Georg has its centers mainly in the area of the former Austro-Hungarian Monarchy.

Conceptual history

Medieval migrations
By the mid-14th century,  when the Black Death brought an end to the 500-year-long  process, populations from Western Europe had moved into the "Wendish" Central European areas of  far beyond the Elbe and Saale rivers. They had moved along the Baltic coast from Holstein to Farther Pomerania, up the Oder river to the Moravian Gate, down the Danube into the Kingdom of Hungary and into the Slovene lands of Carniola. From the mouth of the Vistula river and the Prussian region, the Teutonic Knights by force continued the migration up to Estonian Reval (Tallinn). They had also settled the mountainous border regions of Bohemia and Moravia and formed a distinct social class of citizens in towns like Prague, Havlíčkův Brod (German Brod), Olomouc (Olmütz) and Brno (Brünn). They had moved into the Polish Kraków Voivodeship, the Western Carpathians and Transylvania (Siebenbürgen), introducing the practice of crop rotation and German town law.

Different visions of 
In the first half of the 19th century, ideas of a Central-European federation between the Russian Empire and the West European great powers arose, based on geographical, ethnic and economic considerations.

The term  was formally introduced by Karl Ludwig von Bruck and Lorenz von Stein, a first theorization of the term attempted in 1848, with the aim of a series of interlocking economic confederations. However, plans advocated by the Austrian minister-president, Prince Felix of Schwarzenberg, foundered on the resistance of the German states. After the Austro-Prussian War of 1866 and the Prussian-led unification of Germany under Chancellor Otto von Bismarck in 1871, Austria had to abandon its claim to leadership and thereafter used  to refer to the lands of Austria-Hungary in the Danube basin. In Austria, the  concept evolved as an alternative to the German question, equivalent to an amalgamation of the states of the German Confederation and the multi-ethnic Austrian Empire under the firm leadership of the Habsburg dynasty.

Political and ethnic visions of a  began to dominate in Germany. After the Revolutions of 1848 liberal theorists like Friedrich List and Heinrich von Gagern, socialists and then later groups like the German National Liberal Party would adopt the idea. However, a distinct Pan-German notion accompanied by the concept of a renewed settler colonialism would become associated with the idea. In the German Empire, the  concentrated on the achievements by ethnic Germans in Central Europe on the basis of ethnocentrism with significant anti-Slavic, especially anti-Polish notions, as propagated by the Pan-German League.

The Prussian  Plan

The  plan was to achieve an economic and cultural hegemony over Central Europe by the German Empire and subsequent economic and financial exploitation of this region combined with direct annexations, making of  puppet states, and the creation of puppet states for a buffer between Germany and Russia.
The issue of Central Europe was taken by German thinker Friedrich Naumann in 1915 in his work . According to his thought, this part of Europe was to become a politically and economically integrated bloc subjected to German rule. In his program, Naumann also supported programs of Germanization and Hungarization as well. In his book, Naumann used imperialist rhetoric combined with praises to nature, and imperial condescension towards non-German people, while advising politicians to show some "flexibility" towards non-German languages to achieve "harmony". Naumann wrote that it would stabilize the whole Central-European region. Some parts of the planning included designs on creating a new state in Crimea and have the  Baltic states to be client states.

The ruling political elites of Germany accepted the  plan during World War I while drawing out German war aims and plans for the new order of Europe.  was to be created by establishing a series of puppet states whose political, economic and military aspects would be under the control of the German Reich. The entire region was to serve as an economic backyard of Germany, whose exploitation would enable the German sphere of influence to better compete against strategic rivals like Britain, the United States. Political, military and economic organization was to be based on German domination, with commercial treaties imposed on countries like Poland and Ukraine. It was believed that the German working classes could be appeased by German politicians through the economic benefits of territorial annexation, a new economic sphere of influence, and 
exploitation of conquered countries for the material benefit of Germany. Partial realization of these plans was reflected in the Treaty of Brest-Litovsk, where guarantees of economic and military domination over Ukraine by Germany were laid out. The  plan was viewed as a threat by the British Empire, which concluded it would destroy British continental trade and  diminish its military power.

Other visions of 
While  describes a geographical location, it also is the word denoting a political concept of a German-dominated and exploited Central European union that was put into motion during the First World War. The historian Jörg Brechtefeld describes  as the following:

Mitteleuropean literature of the period between the end of the 19th century and World War II has been the subject of renewed interest, starting in the 1960s. Pioneers in this revival have been Claudio Magris, Roberto Calasso, and the Italian publishing house Adelphi. In the 1920s, French scholar Pierre Renouvin published eleven volumes of documents explaining that Germany decided to bail out Austria which they believed was threatened with economic disintegration by Serbian and other nationalist movements.  J Keiger maintained in the debate on the Fischer Controversy that confirmed this opinion rebutting revisionist arguments that Germany was looking for an excuse to occupy Austro-Hungary.

German Chancellor Theobald von Bethmann Hollweg's plan prepared for a Central European Economic Union. Published in September 1914, the program for interdependent development was designed to include France in a Central European Customs Federation. The German occupation of Belgium was the first phase in this process, which ultimately failed to come to fruition. Plans to create a Duchy of Flanders and a Grand Duchy of Warsaw were discussed as political units of future "localized" administration. The original economic plan was conceived pre-1914 by Walther Rathenau and Alfred von Gwinner, respectively, with the legal support of Hans Delbrück. There were concerns from Schoenbeck and others that it would make Germany too inward-looking, but  gained the support of von Hertling, later a Chancellor and Kurt Kuhlmann, the diplomat. The major sticking point was continued and exclusive German access to Austrian markets, while in the mind of others, like von Falkenhausen, mastery of competition was not possible before military mastery of Europe.

Capturing this mining area west of Alsace-Lorraine, already annexed since 1871, was a major part of the  Plan and Germany's war aims. The high plateau dominated the French interior, giving the German army a wide range of fire. But the area also contained immensely prized deposits of iron. These were essential to both France and German war efforts. The development of heavy industry was a central feature of economic policy "under Imperial Protective Administration." Initially, Roedern, the  treasurer, was deeply skeptical that a plan to "incorporate" French assets into a customs union and federation would succeed, but civilian doubts were overcome by January 1915, and by 26 August 1916, it was official German policy.

Anglophile Albert Ballin, therefore, set up a "German–Belgian trading company" to transfer assets and people from the occupied territories back to the Reich. The Post Office was to become German, and so too the railways, and the banks, all overseen by an Economics Committee, which would be a liaison group between private enterprise and the public sector. German obsession with the "Race to the Sea" and right to Belgian seaports continued to be a major policy initiative in the Memorandum of "Attachement" maritime security persisted in the German-Luxembourg Customs Association finally completed on 25 November 1915. Much of the theoretical work would be carried out by Six Economic Associations discussed in memoranda from Spring 1915 designated so as to set Germany free from British tutelage.

 also had its opponents inside Germany. Erich Marcks, a historian from Magdeburg and a member of SPD, had referred to "that great European idea" before the war.

Culture
Mitteleuropa is also used in a cultural sense to denote a fertile region whose thought has brought many fruits, artistic and cultural. It is also sometimes denote with the expression "Habsburg thought and culture." The rich Mitteleuropean literary and cultural traditions include Polish philosophy, Czech avantgarde literature, Hungarian social theory and science, Austrian lyric poetry, and the common capacity for irony and linguistic prowess.

According to the Jewish Hungarian writer György Konrád, the Mitteleuropean spirit is "an aesthetic sensibility that allows for complexity and multilingualism, a strategy that rests on understanding even one's deadly enemy," a spirit that "consist of accepting plurality as a value in and of itself." In Prague, in 1984, the journal Střední Evropa was founded, albeit characterized by a Catholic revisionist view nostalgic of the pre-1918 Habsburg Empire. Polish poet Zbigniew Herbert wrote the poem , included in his 1992 book Rovigo (Wrocław).

Among the main writers of the literary  are Joseph Roth (1894–1939), Stefan Zweig (1881–1942), Arnold Zweig (1887–1968) and Lion Feuchtwanger (1884–1958). Roth's novel Radetzky March is a study of the decline and fall of the Austro-Hungarian Empire, via the story of a family’s elevation to the nobility.

Other authors that have been catalogued as of Mitteleuropean literature are the Hungarians Sándor Márai (1900–1989), János Székely (1901–1958), Milán Füst (1888–1967), Ödön von Horváth (1901–1938); the Polish-Yiddish Israel Joshua Singer; the Czech-Austrians Leo Perutz (1882–1957), Alfred Kubin (1877–1959), Franz Werfel (1890–1945), Johannes Urzidil (1896–1970), Ernst Weiss (1882–1940); the Austrians Arthur Schnitzler (1862–1931), Alexander Lernet-Holenia (1897–1976), Hermann Broch (1886–1951), Soma Morgenstern (1890–1976), Karl Kraus (1874–1936), Hugo von Hofmannsthal (1874–1929), Peter Altenberg (1859–1919); the Croatian Miroslav Krleža (1893–1981); the Bulgarian Elias Canetti (1905–1994); the German Frank Wedekind (1864–1918); the Italians Italo Svevo (1861–1928),  Claudio Magris (1939–), and Roberto Calasso (1941–); and the Swiss Carl Seelig (1894–1962).

Outside of fiction, eccentric scholars of Old Austria include Léopold Szondi, Eugen Heinrich Schmitt, and Josef Popper-Lynkeus.

See also

 Central Europe
 
 
 Geographical centre of Europe
 Germans of Romania
  for a plan by Polish leaders after World War I to create a similar political structure across the same region, but for the benefit and security of Poland.
  for the governing authority that actually governed much of this region after Russian surrender in WWI
 Puppet state for a list of nations founded by Germany for the purpose of creating this block
 Ukrainian State for the Ukrainian government Germany supported for this purpose.
Maciej Górny: Concept of Mitteleuropa, in: 1914-1918-online. International Encyclopedia of the First World War.

Notes

References

Bibliography
 JFV Keiger, The Fischer Controversy, the War Origins Debate and France: A non-history of Cambridge, Journal of Contemporary History (London 2010), pp. 363–375
 Fritz Fischer, The War Aims of Germany, 1914–1918, (1967)
 J. Brechtefeld, Mitteleuropa and German politics. 1848 to the present (London 1996)

19th century in Germany
Central Europe
Former eastern territories of Germany
German words and phrases
Late modern Europe
Political history of Germany
Political terminology in Germany
Prussian Partition
Regions of Europe
Spheres of influence

de:Mitteleuropa